773 Naval Air Squadron (773 NAS) was a Naval Air Squadron of the Royal Navy's Fleet Air Arm.

As the waters around the Imperial fortress colony of Bermuda (the main base and Royal Naval Dockyard of the America and West Indies Station) became a working-up area for US Navy and Royal Canadian Navy vessels, as well as for lend-lease ex-US Navy vessels of the Royal Navy, preparing to join the Battle of the Atlantic, Fleet Air Arm target tugs were based at Royal Naval Air Station Bermuda to assist in training anti-aircraft gunners afloat or ashore. 773 Fleet Requirements Unit was formed at Bermuda on the 3 June 1940, equipped with Blackburn Roc target tugs. These were normally meant to operate from carrier decks, and had retractable undercarriage. To operate from RNAS Bermuda, which was only able to handle flyingboats and floatplanes, they were fitted with floats. They towed targets for anti-aircraft gunnery practice by Allied vessels working-up at Bermuda, as well as by a United States Navy anti-aircraft gunnery training centre operating on shore at Warwick Parish for the duration of the war. When the United States Army's Kindley Field (built under a 99-year free lease from the British Government on the understanding that it would be used jointly by the Royal Air Force establishment in Bermuda and Fleet Air Arm) became operational in 1943, the floats were removed from the Rocs, which thenceforth operated from the British end of the airfield as landplanes, being the first aircraft based there. 773 Fleet Requirements Unit disbanded on 25 April 1944.

References

Citations

Bibliography

700 series Fleet Air Arm squadrons
Military units and formations established in 1940
Military units and formations of the Royal Navy in World War II